Ilderton is a small village in Northumberland, England. It is located on the edge of the Northumberland National Park, between Lilburn, Northumberland in the east and Hedgehope Hill in the west.

The place-name 'Ilderton' is first attested in Charter Rolls of circa 1125 as Ildretona, and as Hildreton during the reign of Henry II. The name means 'elder town or settlement', the word 'elder' referring to the tree of that name.

Landmarks 
The parish church of St Michael retains a thirteenth-century tower. In the churchyard at its western edge is the stone-built Roddam Mausoleum, which is tunnel-vaulted inside. Dating from 1795, it contains the tomb of Admiral Robert Roddam.

The area is noted for its large number of earthworks and remains of prehistoric settlements, for example the stone circle in Threestoneburn Wood to the west.

References

External links

GENUKI (Accessed: 19 November 2008)

Villages in Northumberland